Azad Hind Fouz Smriti Mahavidyalaya is an undergraduate liberal arts college in Domjur, West Bengal, India. It is in Howrah district. It is affiliated with the University of Calcutta.

Departments

Arts and Commerce

Bengali
English
History
Geography
Political Science
 Sanskrit
Economics
Education
Commerce

Accreditation
The college is recognized by the University Grants Commission (UGC).

See also
Education in India
University of Burdwan
Literacy in India
List of institutions of higher education in West Bengal

References

External links
 http://ahfsm.ac.in/

Educational institutions established in 1986
University of Calcutta affiliates
Universities and colleges in Howrah district
1986 establishments in West Bengal